RTP3 (receptor transporter protein 3) is a gene located on chromosome 3 in humans that encodes the RTP3 protein. Its expression is liver-restricted.

Gene
Aliases for RTP3 in Homo sapiens include LTM1, TMEM7, and Z3CXXC3. It is located at locus 3p21.31 and contains two exons. It spans a total of 2,974 base pairs, between bases 46497976 and 46500950 on chromosome 3.

Protein
There is only one known protein isoform in humans, which is 232 amino acids long and has a predicted molecular weight of 26.9 kDa. It has a predicted isoelectric point of 9. The protein contains a transmembrane domain near the C-terminus. The protein is rich in cysteine and tryptophan and is poor in aspartic acid.

Gene regulation
Regulation of the RTP3 gene appears to be tissue-specific, as it is expressed almost exclusively in the liver, with low levels of expression in the testes, thyroid, kidney, and adrenal gland.

There are some poorly-conserved binding sites for miRNA molecules in the 3' untranslated region of the gene. One of these is miRNA-29, which has been found to affect progression of liver tumors in mouse models.

Homologs

Orthologs
Many animal species contain orthologs of the RTP3 gene, including various species of mammals, rodents, and birds.

Paralogs
RTP3 has several paralogs in humans, including other members of the RTP family.

Interacting proteins
While there is experimental evidence RTP3 may potentially be able to interact with proteins involved in olfactory signaling, as it contains shared homology with other members of the RTP family that do so, it is unlikely that it contributes greatly to olfactory signaling pathways due to its expression being almost exclusive to the liver.

Clinical significance
The RTP3 gene has been found to be downregulated in liver carcinomas. In cell lines that do not contain p53, a tumor suppressor protein, RTP3 has found to be more highly expressed than in cell lines that do contain the protein.

Single-nucleotide polymorphisms in the promoter and intron of the RTP3 gene have been associated with increased risk of hip fracture, suggesting possible involvement of the gene in the TGF-β signaling pathway.

References

Genes on human chromosome 3